Michael Collins (born 26 February 1968) is an Irish Independent politician who has been a Teachta Dála (TD) for the Cork South-West constituency since the 2016 general election.

Political career
He served as a member of Cork County Council from 2014 to 2016.

In May 2018, the Irish Independent published a "political rich list", outlining how much personal wealth Ireland's political class was estimated to have. The report featured Collins and estimated him to be a millionaire, suggesting he had property assets worth almost €850,000 alone.

Collins was re-elected at the 2020 general election.

In December 2021 Collins was among a group of TDs who proposed a bill in the Dáil that would require pain relief for a foetus during later abortions. The bill was defeated by 107 votes to 36. The Minister of Health Stephen Donnelly stated it would not be appropriate for a piece of legislation to dictate clinical practice in a medical or a healthcare setting. Meanwhile, Collins' fellow Cork South-West TD Holly Cairns stated that the move was "upsetting for the women and families who have had later abortions and insulting to our healthcare practitioners" and suggested Collins and his group were determined to try and re-run and undermine the 2018 referendum on the Eighth amendment using American conservative style tactics.

Political views
In January 2018, in the run up to the referendum on the 8th amendment of that May, Collins stated that he was "against abortion. Full stop."

In May 2021, while speaking in the Dáil, Collins suggested that a hotel chain being used by the government to quarantine those suspected of having COVID-19 was linked to Jeffrey Epstein.

Controversies
In September 2019, Collins defended anti-immigrant rhetoric used by fellow TD Noel Grealish, and in doing so claimed Ireland was "losing its culture" because of immigrants and suggested that Ireland should "look after our own people first and then when that issue is sorted, let's start looking at people from across the world". For this, both he and Grealish were criticised in Irish political circles, with Labour leader Brendan Howlin calling the pair "highly dangerous", and Irish President Michael D. Higgins, while not directly referencing them, publicly rejected their rhetoric, suggested it was not factual that immigrants were replacing people in Ireland, and that immigrants accounted for a high percentage of Ireland's GDP.

In February 2020, after the general election, Collins referred to Minister for Transport, Tourism and Sport Shane Ross as a "scumbag". In response, John Halligan said that Collins was a man "beneath contempt" and a hypocrite who claims not to make personal attacks, but, in fact, does so repeatedly. Collins had previously referred to Ross as a "clown" in a separate incident, and upon learning that Ross had not been re-elected on the same night, he said he was happy to see Ross "on the scrapheap of Irish politics". Collins later apologised for his comments about Ross and denied being drunk when he made them.

In June 2020 and in the midst of global protests over the murder of George Floyd, Collins was criticised alongside Danny Healy-Rae when both TDs used the slogan "All Lives Matter". Collins described the phrase as "his mantra" and said the phrase meant he valued everyone equally regardless of background. Shane Curry of the Irish Network Against Racism said he found it hard to believe that both Collins and Healy-Rae were naive about the meaning of the slogan and didn't know that many people use the phrase as a refutation of the Black Lives Matter Movement. During the same period, Collins rejected calls for statues and plaques commemorating historic figures involved in the Transatlantic slave trade be removed.

While speaking on the Claire Byrne radio show on RTÉ in November 2020, Collins defended giving the roles of his parliamentary assistant and parliamentary secretary to his brother and his partner, respectively. Collins said he denied that this was a "jobs for the boys" situation.

In December 2020, Collins was amongst only 3 TDs out of 160 to say he would not take a COVID-19 vaccine in a survey conducted by the Claire Byrne show. Collins stated he did not trust "professionals and companies who make money from the vaccine". In response to his comments, James O'Connor of Fianna Fáil criticised Collins in the Dáil, saying that it was "absolutely outrageous that we have members of this House who are willing to come in here and pander to the message of anti-vaxxers. It’s disgusting" and noted that “the Covid-19 vaccine has seen more investment than any other vaccination in history”. Following O'Connor's comments, Collins augmented his statement and declared he would be happy to take a vaccine "if it was proven to work".

References

1958 births
Living people
Members of the 32nd Dáil
Independent TDs
Members of the 33rd Dáil